Suau, also known as Iou, is an Oceanic language spoken in the Milne Bay Province of Papua New Guinea. It is spoken by 6,800 people and a further 14,000 as a lingua franca.

Phonology 

 Some village dialects also include a fricative sound .
  can also be heard as a flap  in free variation.
  may also rarely be pronounced as  among speakers.

External links 
Ekalesia Bukana (1895), Anglican Morning Prayer in Suau, digitized by Richard Mammana
Paradisec has a number of collections of Suau materials, including two collections of Arthur Cappell's (AC1, AC2).

References

Nuclear Papuan Tip languages
Languages of Milne Bay Province